August Rieke (born 26 May 1935) is a German former cyclist. He competed in the sprint event at the 1960 Summer Olympics.

References

External links
 

1935 births
Living people
German male cyclists
Olympic cyclists of the United Team of Germany
Cyclists at the 1960 Summer Olympics
Cyclists from North Rhine-Westphalia
People from Herford (district)
Sportspeople from Detmold (region)